Edmond Memorial High School is a public secondary school located in Edmond, Oklahoma, one of three high schools in the Edmond school district. It serves approximately 2,300 students.

History 
The school was originally named Edmond High School because it was the only secondary school within the city limits. The first class graduated in 1922, and consisted of 24 students. As Edmond grew, the school changed location several times, moving to its current location on 15th Street in the mid-1960s. The current building was built in 1966 as a seventh grade only school. It opened to its first class of seventh graders the second semester of the 66–67 school year. At that point, Edmond High School was located at the corner of Ninth Street and Rankin. It housed all sophomores, juniors and seniors in Edmond. That building is now called Central Middle School and houses sixth, seventh and eighth graders from several elementary schools on the east side of Edmond. Also, it has lost its original, distinctive E shape due to new additions.

In 1975, the name of the school was changed to Edmond Memorial High School to honor six alumni who were killed while serving in Vietnam: Floyd Frazier, Jr., Allen Garrett, James Johnson, James Leonard, Danny Shores, and John Wilson. Because of its rapidly increasing size, in 1994 the school split into three, now rival schools, including Edmond North High School and Edmond Santa Fe High School.

On April 4th, 1998, a pipe bomb was set off by 3 students,in an attempt to destroy the fiberglass bulldog in the foyer of the school. The bulldog, however, remained intact. 

In the past decade, Memorial has undergone several new construction projects, including an expanded library, new parking lots, a new football locker room/pom and cheer practice facility, and a new freshmen academy. The auditorium has also been renovated.

Statistics
For the 2016–2017 school year, the school had an enrollment of 2,220 students and 98.8 classroom teachers. The graduation rate for the class of 2017 was 98.9%  percent.  Memorial has over twenty teachers certified by the National Board for Professional Teaching Standards, who teach in every academic department.

Awards and recognition 
Memorial received the Department of Education Blue Ribbon School Award of Excellence in 2001–2002 school year, one of the highest honors an American high school can achieve. In 2008 Edmond Memorial was named the Siemens Foundation award winner for the state of Oklahoma for its consistently high Advanced Placement test scores in science, math and technology. The senior class of 2007 received more than $11  million in scholarship offers, and 60 percent of the class took AP classes. In the 2021-2022 school year, Memorial won the state championship for softball, Rocket League, and League of Legends. In 2022, Memorial won the state championship for volleyball and softball for the 2022-2023 school year.

Notable alumni 
 Allison Brown, Miss Teen USA 1986
 Scott Case, former NFL defensive back
 Trey Kennedy, comedian and social media personality
 Kevin Meyer, award-winning filmmaker, director, and writer.
 Paul Blair, former professional football player
 Kristian Doolittle, basketball player for Hapoel Eilat of the Israeli Basketball Premier League
 Micha Hancock, Olympic gold medalist and professional volleyball player.
 Johny Hendricks, mixed martial artist, former UFC Welterweight Champion
 Marcus Nash, former NFL wide receiver
 Jordan Woodard, professional basketball player
 James Woodard, professional basketball player
 Garrett Richards, Major League Baseball pitcher
 Bill Self, Hall of fame men's basketball coach at the University of Kansas
 Wes Sharon, Grammy-nominated album producer

References

External links 
Edmond Memorial High School website

Public high schools in Oklahoma
Educational institutions established in 1893
Schools in Oklahoma County, Oklahoma
Edmond, Oklahoma
1893 establishments in Oklahoma Territory